Discina is a monotypic genus of Discinidae brachiopods, comprising the species Discina striata.

References

Discinida
Jeffersonville Limestone